Justice Morton may refer to:

James Madison Morton Sr. (1837–1923), associate justice of the Massachusetts Supreme Judicial Court
John Morton (American politician) (1725–1777), associate justice of the Supreme Court of Pennsylvania
Marcus Morton (1784–1864), associate justice of the Massachusetts Supreme Judicial Court
Marcus Morton (judge) (1819–1891), chief justice of the Massachusetts Supreme Judicial Court, and son of the previous